Johann Urbanek (10 October 1910 – 7 July 2000) was an Austrian football midfielder who played for Austria in the 1934 FIFA World Cup. He later played one game for Germany during World War II. He also played for FK Austria Wien.

References

External links
 

1910 births
2000 deaths
Austrian footballers
Austria international footballers
Germany international footballers
Association football midfielders
FK Austria Wien players
1934 FIFA World Cup players
German footballers
Dual internationalists (football)